Thomas Megahy MBE (16 July 1929 – 5 October 2008) was British teacher and politician, who served in the European Parliament.

Megahy was educated at Wishaw High School, Ruskin College, the Huddersfield College of Education and the University of London.  He worked as a railway signalman, but later became a lecturer.  In 1963, he was elected to Mirfield Urban District Council, representing the Labour Party, and from 1973 until 1978, he served on Kirklees Metropolitan Borough Council.

Megahy served as a Member of the European Parliament for the constituency of Yorkshire South West between 1979 and 1999.  From 1985 until 1987, he was deputy leader of the British Labour Group, and from 1987 until 1989, he was a vice president of the Parliament.

References

1929 births
2008 deaths
Alumni of Ruskin College
Alumni of the University of London
People from Lanarkshire
Scottish people of Irish descent
Councillors in Kirklees
Labour Party (UK) councillors
Labour Party (UK) MEPs
MEPs for England 1979–1984
MEPs for England 1984–1989
MEPs for England 1989–1994
MEPs for England 1994–1999
Members of the Order of the British Empire